"Trust Me Baby / In Dreams" is a double a-side single by Latin American musician Empress Of, released on April 11, 2018 through Terrible Records. with "Trust Me Baby" later appearing on her second studio album, Us (2018). The two songs prominently feature Rodriguez singing in both Spanish and English, fluidly switching between the two languages, in the same vein of her 2013 EP Systems.

"Trust Me Baby" was co-produced by LA producer and former Ariel Pink touring guitarist, Cole M.G.N.

Track listing

Notes
  signifies a co-producer.

References

External links
 
 
 

2018 singles
2018 songs
Empress Of songs